An election to Limerick City Council took place on 10 June 1999 as part of that year's Irish local elections. 17 councillors were elected from four local electoral areas  for a five-year term of office on the system of proportional representation by means of the single transferable vote (PR-STV).

Results by party

Results by Electoral Area

Limerick No.1

Limerick No.2

Limerick No.3

Limerick No.4

External links

1999 Irish local elections
1999